Maryam Maghraby (born 7 October 2004) is an Egyptian synchronized swimmer. She competed in the 2017 Comen cup 2018 Comen cup and 2020 Summer Olympics.

References

2004 births
Living people
Synchronized swimmers at the 2020 Summer Olympics
Egyptian synchronized swimmers
Olympic synchronized swimmers of Egypt